103.1 Dream FM (DXGO 103.1 MHz) is an FM station owned and operated by the Department of Education - Division of Kidapawan. Its studios and transmitter are located at Poblacion, Kidapawan.

References

External links
Facebook Page

Radio stations in Cotabato